Birch Lake is an unincorporated community in Medstead Rural Municipality No. 497, Saskatchewan, Canada.

See also 
 List of communities in Saskatchewan

References 

Medstead No. 497, Saskatchewan
Unincorporated communities in Saskatchewan
Division No. 16, Saskatchewan